Benedict von Schirach or Benedikt von Schirach:

 Gottlob Benedikt von Schirach (1743–1804), a Sorbian historian, philosopher and writer
 Baldur Benedikt von Schirach (1907–1974), a Nazi German politician
 Benedict von Schirach (novelist) (born 1984), a German-Swiss novelist now named Benedict Wells

See also 
 Schirach family
 Benedict (disambiguation)
 Benedikt (disambiguation)